Tachydromia  umbrarum is a species of fly in the family Hybotidae. It is found in the  Palearctic .

References

External links
Images representing Tachydromia  umbrarum at BOLD

Hybotidae
Insects described in 1833
Diptera of Europe